Gregson is a ghost town in northwestern Silver Bow and southeastern Deer Lodge counities in Montana, United States.

History
A post office operated in Gregson between 1897 and 1937.

References

Unincorporated communities in Deer Lodge County, Montana
Unincorporated communities in Silver Bow County, Montana
Unincorporated communities in Montana